Theonomy (from Greek theos "God" and nomos "law") is a hypothetical Christian form of government in which society is ruled by divine law. Theonomists hold that divine law, particularly the judicial laws of the Old Testament, should be observed by modern societies. 

The precise definition of theonomy is the presumption that the Old Covenant judicial laws given to Israel have not been abrogated, and therefore all civil governments are morally obligated to enforce them (including the specific penalties). Theonomy holds that all civil governments must refrain from coercion if Scripture has not prescribed their intervention (the "regulative principle of the state"). 

Theonomy is distinct from the "theonomous ethics" proposed by Paul Tillich.

Origin
Thomas Aquinas held, "if a sovereign were to order these judicial precepts to be observed in his kingdom, he would not sin." Some have mistakenly referred to that as "General Equity Theonomy" but it is in fact distinct from theonomy insofar as Aquinas believed the specifics of the Old Testament judicial laws were no longer binding. He instead taught that the judicial precepts contained varying degrees of universal principles of justice that reflected natural law.

In Christian reconstructionism, theonomy is the idea that God provides the basis of both personal and social ethics in the Bible. Theonomic ethics asserts that the Bible has been given as the abiding standard for all human government (individual, family, church, and civil) and that biblical law must be incorporated into a Christian theory of biblical ethics'

Some critics  see theonomy as a significant form of dominion theology, which they define as a type of theocracy. Theonomy posits that the biblical law is applicable to civil law, and theonomists propose biblical law as the standard by which the laws of nations may be measured and to which they ought to be conformed.

Goals
Various theonomic authors have stated such goals as "the universal development of Biblical theocratic republics," exclusion of non-Christians from voting and citizenship, and the application of Biblical law by the state. Under such a system of biblical law, homosexual acts, adultery, witchcraft, and blasphemy would be punishable by death. Propagation of idolatry or "false religions" would be illegal and could also be punished by the death penalty. 

More recent theonomic writers such as Joel McDurmon, former President of American Vision, have moved away from this position, stating that these death penalties are no longer binding in the new covenant. Former pastor and theonomy critic, JD Hall, who debated McDurmon in 2015, has argued that abandoning Mosaic penologies such as the death penalty means that McDurmon and others who hold similar positions cannot be said to hold to theonomy in any meaningful way.

According to the theonomist Greg Bahnsen, the laws of God are the standard which Christian voters and officials ought to pursue. The civil law given to the nation of Israel, it is stated, is continuously binding, although apart from what are considered by him to be surrounding cultural connotations specific to this nation itself.

Relation to Reformed theology
Some in modern Reformed churches are critical of any relationship between the historical Reformed faith and theonomy, but other Calvinists affirm that theonomy is consistent with the historic Reformed confessions.

See also
 Biblical law in Christianity
 Christian anarchism
 Christian views on the Old Covenant
 Halachic state
 Islamism
 Kahanism
 Kinism
 Law and Gospel
 Macroethics and microethics
 Neo-Calvinism
 Postmillennialism
 Sharia
 Theodemocracy

References

Further reading

Primary sources by theonomists
 
 
 
 
 

Secondary sources and criticisms

External links
 What is Theonomy? by Chalcedon Foundation
 Proof that Modern Theonomy Advocates the Historic Understanding of the Judicial Law
 Comments on an Old-New Error by Meredith Kline
 The Shadow of Christ in the Law of Moses by Vern Poythress

Far-right politics
Christian reconstructionism
Christian terminology
Dominion theology
Mosaic law in Christian theology
Theocracy